The Pinacoteca Civica Padre Pietro Tacchi Venturi is the civic art gallery of the town of San Severino Marche, region of Marche, Italy. Located at Via Salimbeni 39, it mainly displays sacred paintings from prior centuries.

Structure
The art gallery and museum was constituted in 1974 to house collections of works from former local churches and monasteries. Among its collections are works by the brothers Lorenzo (Mystical Marriage of St Catherine) and Jacopo Salimbeni, Paolo Veneziano, Allegretto Nuzi (Madonna dell'Umiltà), Lorenzo d'Alessandro (Pietà); Vittore Crivelli (a polyptych depicting the Madonna and Saints), and Pinturicchio (Madonna della Pace); two canvases by Pomarancio; fresco fragments by followers of Giotto; a Martyrdom of St Bartholemew by a 17th-century Lombard painter; a number of wooden engravings in globes; and wooden choir stalls (1513), including ones by the studio of Domenico Indivini.

References

Gallery

External links
Pinacoteca civica P. Tacchi Venturi, official website

Buildings and structures in San Severino Marche
Museums in Marche
Art museums and galleries in Marche